Myurella nebulosa is a species of sea snail, a marine gastropod mollusk in the family Terebridae, the auger snails.

Description

Distribution
This marine species occurs off Papua New Guinea

References

 Terryn Y. (2007). Terebridae: A Collectors Guide. Conchbooks & Natural Art. 59 pp + plates
 Severns, M. (2011). Shells of the Hawaiian Islands – The Sea Shells. Conchbooks, Hackenheim. 564 pp

External links
 Sowerby, G. B., I. (1825). A catalogue of the shells contained in the collection of the late Earl of Tankerville : arranged according to the Lamarckian conchological system: together with an appendix, containing descriptions of many new species London, vii + 92 + xxxiv pp
 Fedosov, A. E.; Malcolm, G.; Terryn, Y.; Gorson, J.; Modica, M. V.; Holford, M.; Puillandre, N. (2020). Phylogenetic classification of the family Terebridae (Neogastropoda: Conoidea). Journal of Molluscan Studies. 85(4): 359-388

Terebridae
Gastropods described in 1825